Relentless IV: Ashes to Ashes is a 1994 crime thriller film directed by Oley Sassone. The tagline was: "This time nothing can stop the fear."  Relentless IV was filmed in Los Angeles, California. This is the fourth and to date final installment in the Relentless series.

Synopsis

Detective Sam Dietz (Leo Rossi) must yet again find and stop another serial killer who kills women in ritualistic executions. Detective work for Dietz is tough, as he has to juggle two women. One of them is his new female partner Jessica (Colleen Coffey), and the other is psychiatrist Sara Lee Jaffee (Famke Janssen) who holds the key to the case.

Cast
 Leo Rossi as Det. Sam Dietz
 Famke Janssen as Dr. Sara Lee Jaffee
 Colleen Coffey as Det. Jessica Parreti
 John Scott Clough as Martin Trainer
 Christopher Pettiet as Cory Dietz
 Ken Lerner as Al Rosenberg
 Loring Pickering as Det. Keller
 Lisa Robin Kelly as Sherrie
 Rainer Grant as Victim #1 Hairdresser
 Charlene Henryson as Victim #2 Deaf Woman
 Claudette Roche as Victim #3 Grocery Shopper
 John Kelly as Apartment Neighbor
 John Meyers as Murder Suspect

Home media
The film was released directly to videocassette on December 21, 1994. In 2006, Image Entertainment released a double feature DVD of this and the previous third film, in widescreen.

Other films in the series
 Relentless (1989)
 Dead On: Relentless II (1992)
 Relentless 3 (1993)

External links
 
 

1994 crime thriller films
1994 films
1994 direct-to-video films
1990s serial killer films
American crime thriller films
American sequel films
American police detective films
CineTel Films films
Films shot in Los Angeles
Films scored by Terry Plumeri
1990s English-language films
1990s American films